Sudhansu Bhushan Das (born 17 April 1915) was an Indian politician belonging to the Indian National Congress. He was elected from Diamond Harbour, West Bengal  to the Lok Sabha, lower house of the Parliament of India.

References

External links
Official biographical sketch in Parliament of India website

1915 births
Possibly living people
People from West Bengal
India MPs 1962–1967
Lok Sabha members from West Bengal
Indian National Congress politicians